Blackout cake, sometimes called Brooklyn Blackout cake, is a chocolate cake filled with chocolate pudding and topped with chocolate cake crumbs. It was invented during World War II by a Brooklyn bakery chain named Ebinger's, in recognition of the mandatory blackouts to protect the Brooklyn Navy Yard.

After the war, the name persisted for a very dark chocolate cake and became common across the American Midwest.  Ebinger's variety was very popular and became a signature offering, popular with Brooklyn residents, until the chain of more than fifty locations closed in 1972.

See also
 List of desserts

References

Chocolate desserts
Puddings
Cuisine of New York City
Cuisine of the Midwestern United States
American cakes
Layer cakes